Turnbull House is a historic building in Wellington, New Zealand. It was built in 1915 as the residence of Alexander Turnbull and to house his private library, later bequeathed to New Zealand as the Alexander Turnbull Library. It is listed by Heritage New Zealand as a Category 1 historic place. Turnbull House is situated across the road from The Beehive, and is now completely surrounded by the much larger buildings which form New Zealand's Parliamentary Precinct, including Bowen House, the Treasury Building, Parliament House and The Beehive.

History

The House's architecture is a mix of Queen Anne and Scottish baronial architecture and was designed by architect William Turnbull (no relation). The building's design incorporated three large library rooms to house Turnbull's large collection of books, maps, and documents. The outbreak of World War I delayed construction of the house until late 1915. After Turnbull's death in 1918, the house was purchased by the government in 1920 and opened to the public as the Alexander Turnbull Library. The library stayed in the building until 1973 when the collection was incorporated into the National Library of New Zealand.

After many years as a meeting and conference venue, the building was closed to the public in 2012 due to earthquake risk. Investigations have taken longer than expected but strengthening work is intended to be completed before a 2023 deadline.

References

External links

 Heritage New Zealand: Turnbull House

Buildings and structures in Wellington City
Heritage New Zealand Category 1 historic places in the Wellington Region
Houses in New Zealand
Historic homes in New Zealand
Scottish baronial architecture